The Yamaha MT-03 is a MT series single-cylinder, later  parallel twin-cylinder naked motorcycle produced by Yamaha Motor Company since 2006–2014, and 2016–present. It is available worldwide.

2006–2014 

The first version of the MT-03 was produced from 2006-2014. Its engine is derived from the XT660R.

2016–2019 

In 2016, Yamaha reintroduced the MT-03, which is now based on the YZF-R3 sport bike.

The MT-03 received an update in October 2019. This refresh marks the first MT-03 to be made available in the United States.

2020–present 
In 2019, Yamaha announced its new 2020 MT-03 edition. The new 2020 model now comes with differently tuned rear suspension and new upside down forks; an MT series exhaust;  and an LED back-light. In addition to this, new items have been added to the multi-function panel making the upgraded dash more user-friendly. The bike also has an redesigned split seat. The model is expected to be available to purchase early 2020.

References

External links 
 Manufacturer model information
 Yamaha-Motor.eu
 Yamaha MT-03 information on MCN website

MT-03
Standard motorcycles
Motorcycles introduced in 2006